Los Menucos Airport  is an airport serving the town of Los Menucos in the Río Negro Province of Argentina.

The runway has 1630 meters graded, with the central  asphalt paved.

See also

Transport in Argentina
List of airports in Argentina

References

External links
OpenStreetMap - Los Menucos
OurAirports - Los Menucos Airport
HERE Maps - Los Menucos

Airports in Argentina